The following lists events that happened during 1859 in New Zealand.

Incumbents

Regal and viceregal
Head of State — Queen Victoria
Governor — Colonel Thomas Gore Browne

Government and law
The 2nd Parliament continues.

Speaker of the House — Sir Charles Clifford
Premier — Edward Stafford.
Minister of Finance — William Richmond is briefly replaced by Henry Sewell between 25 February and 26 April.
Chief Justice — Hon George Arney

Events 
10 January: Pencarrow Head Lighthouse becomes the first permanent lighthouse in New Zealand.  Its first keeper is Mary Jane Bennett, the only woman to hold the position.
13 April: The New Zealand Advertiser starts publishing in Wellington. In 1867 it is incorporated into the New Zealand Times, but it is restored for six months in 1868.
3 October: The Auckland Independent begins publishing. It barely survives into the following year.

Undated
The first wharf is built at Onehunga.

Births
 1 January (in England): John Dumbell, rugby union player.
 18 November (in Scotland): James Nairn, painter

Unknown date
 Thomas Field, politician.
 Charles E. Major, politician.

Deaths
 7 April – John Gray, soldier, politician (born 1801)
 20 April – James Kelly, Australian explorer who was involved in a feud on Otago Peninsula (born 1791)
 30 April – Henry Despard, soldier (born 1784)
 20 July – Alexander Shepherd, public servant and second Colonial Treasurer (born 1797)

See also
List of years in New Zealand
Timeline of New Zealand history
History of New Zealand
Military history of New Zealand
Timeline of the New Zealand environment
Timeline of New Zealand's links with Antarctica

References

External links